Harrison Apartment Building is an historic structure located in the Chinatown neighborhood of Washington, D.C.  The building is the oldest known surviving conventional apartment building in the city.

Background
The architectural firm of Johnson and Company designed the building with a Romanesque Revival façade.  It features rhythmic bays that facilitate increased light and air circulation.  It was listed on the National Register of Historic Places in 1994.

Gallery

See also
 National Register of Historic Places listings in central Washington, D.C.

References

External links
 

Residential buildings completed in 1888
Apartment buildings in Washington, D.C.
Victorian architecture in Washington, D.C.
Residential buildings on the National Register of Historic Places in Washington, D.C.
Judiciary Square